Duck Girl is a bronze sculpture by Paul Manship. It is located in Rittenhouse Square near 18th Street and Walnut Street in Philadelphia, Pennsylvania.

History
Created in 1911, the sculpture was first exhibited in 1914 at the Pennsylvania Academy of Fine Arts, and was awarded the Widener Gold Medal by the Academy that same year.

After the Fairmount Park Art Association (now the Association for Public Art) purchased one of two casts of the sculpture that had been made by Manship, the sculpture was then installed in Cloverly Park in 1916. Later damaged, the sculpture was moved, in 1956, to storage, where it was found by members of the Rittenhouse Square Improvement Association, who then relocated the sculpture to Rittenhouse Square in 1960.

The sculpture is currently owned by the city of Philadelphia.

Design
Evoking classic Greek sculpture, Manship's 5'1" tall bronze sculpture on a 2'8" limestone base depicts a young girl holding a duck.

See also
 List of public art in Philadelphia

References

External links

Outdoor sculptures in Philadelphia
1911 sculptures
Bronze sculptures in Pennsylvania
Rittenhouse Square, Philadelphia
Statues in Pennsylvania
Sculptures of women in Pennsylvania
Sculptures of birds in the United States
Works by Paul Manship